The 2014 FIBA Oceania Under-18 Championship for Women was the qualifying tournament for FIBA Oceania at the 2015 FIBA Under-19 World Championship for Women. The tournament was held in Suva, Fiji from November 27 to December 6. 

Australia defeated New Zealand in the finals, 98-65, while Guam edged Tahiti in the battle for Third Place, 54-48. Australia represented FIBA Oceania at the 2015 FIBA Under-19 World Championship for Women which was held in Russia.

Standings

Group A

Group B

Final round

Classification 5–8

Semifinals

Final classification games

Ninth place game

Seventh place game

Fifth place game

Bronze medal game

Final

Final ranking

References

External links
FIBA Oceania U-18 Championship for Women

FIBA Oceania Under-18 Championship for Women
Oceania
2014–15 in Oceanian basketball
2014 in Fijian sport
International basketball competitions hosted by Fiji
2014 in youth sport